Championship Pony is a virtual life video game by British studio Attractive Games released for Nintendo DS in North America on March 20, 2008. The game allows players to experience equestrianism competition. Competition consists of Cross Country, Show Jumping, and Dressage events.

External links
 GameSpot Summary

2008 video games
Horse-related video games
Nintendo DS games
Nintendo DS-only games
Simulation video games
Destination Software games
Video games developed in the United Kingdom